The Advertising Specialty Institute (ASI) is a for-profit organization serving the advertising specialty industry (which mainly creates and distributes promotional products).

Members of ASI include both manufacturers and suppliers of promotional merchandise as well as promotional product distributors. ASI's main business is organizing and classifying suppliers' products in catalogs, allowing for easy reference by promotional product distributors and sales people. Both parties join ASI for a substantial fee. ASI is part of the Norman Cohn group of companies, Norman Cohn is a Philadelphia PA. resident.

In addition to its cataloging service, ASI publishes magazines and informational literature for the promotional products industry and also holds conventions each year. The "ASI Show" is held in a few major U.S. cities throughout the year, and features a keynote address by a well-known marketer, celebrity, or other well-known figure.

History 

Before ASI, there was no paper based resource for finding promotional products or their suppliers. Small sales people relied on separate paper catalogs from individuals from each individual supplier. In 1950, promotional product salesman Joseph Segel created his own directory called the Advertising Specialty Register and started the company Advertising Specialty Institute. In 1964, the company was sold to Maurice Cohn, whose family still owns the company today.

Other ASI features

ASI Show 
Started in 1998, The ASI show is one of the many annual industry trade shows that brings suppliers and distributors together to showcase the latest promotional products of the year.  ASI also brings in keynote speakers and holds workshops and seminars for ASI members. ASI Shows are held in Orlando, Dallas, Long Beach, New York, and Chicago.

Publications 
ASI publishes several magazines for the advertising specialty industry and has created other online educational and new resources for promotional products companies.  Counselor is its flagship magazine covering the entire promotional products industry. Advantages is a magazine for promotional products sales people. Stitches is a magazine for the custom embroidery industry.  Wearables is a magazine for the promotional apparel industry.

References 

Advertising organizations